Askhat Qanatuly Aimagambetov (Ashat Qanatūly Aimağambetov, ; born 14 June 1982) is a Kazakh politician who served as the Minister of Education and Science of Kazakhstan from June 2019 to January 2023. On June 11, 2022 the ministry was split in two separate ones, and Aimağambetov lead the Ministry of Enlightenment until January 2023.

Biography

Early life and education 
Aimagambetov was born in the village of Aqsu-Aiuly. In 2003 he graduated from the Karagandy State University with a degree in history. In 2006 he graduated from the Karagandy Institute of Actual Education with a degree in jurisprudence.

Career 
From 2002 to 2004, Aimagambetov was an employee of the KarGU. In 2003, he became a member of the Karaganda City Maslihat where he served as a chairman of the Standing Commission on Social Issues.

In 2004, he became a chairman of the NGO Ansar League of Young and in 2005, the director of Media SP LLP.

From 2006 to 2012, Aimagambetov was a lecturer, senior lecturer, and associate professor of the Department of Political Science and Sociology of KarGU. 

In 2012, he was appointed as a deputy akim of the Nurinsky District for Social Issues. From February 2014 to August 2017, Aimagambetov served as the head of the Education Department of the Karaganda Region until he became the Vice Minister of Education and Science. 

On 17 January 2019, Aimagambetov became the deputy akim of Karaganda Region, he served that position until he was appointed as the Minister of Education and Science. 

From June 11, 2022 to January 4 , 2023 , was the Minister of Enlightenment. 

Since February 2023 , he became a lecturer at Kazakh University KAZGUU named after M.Narikbayev.

References 

1982 births
People from Karaganda Region
Government ministers of Kazakhstan
Living people